Bostanabad County is in East Azerbaijan province, Iran. The capital of the county is the city of Bostanabad. At the 2006 census, the county's population was 96,555 in 21,225 households. The following census in 2011 counted 94,985 people in 25,543 households. At the 2016 census, the county's population was 94,769 in 27,647 households.

Administrative divisions

The population history of Bostanabad County's administrative divisions over three consecutive censuses is shown in the following table. The latest census shows two districts, nine rural districts, and two cities.

Geography
The town of Bostanabad in Bostanabad County, located 55 kilometers from Tabriz, populated by Azerbaijanis, was built on the site of the old city of Ojan whose name has been mentioned in many history books since the sixth century AH. Ojan was the summer capital of the Moghuls, and was completely destroyed later on due to various events. 

Quru Göl Lake, a leisure place in East Azerbaijan Province, is one of the natural shelters for many migrant birds.

Warm Water Spring is located near the main road between Tabriz and Tehran.

Aq Bolaq Cave is located in the southern part of the county towards Qareh Chaman.

References

 

Counties of East Azerbaijan Province